Salvación is a town in Southern Peru, capital of the province Manú in the region Madre de Dios.

References

Populated places in the Madre de Dios Region